Babelomurex tuberosus is a species of sea snail, a marine gastropod mollusc in the family Muricidae, the murex snails or rock snails.

References

tuberosus
Gastropods described in 1980